The 1988 Mexican Grand Prix was a Formula One motor race held on 29 May 1988 at the Autódromo Hermanos Rodríguez, Mexico City. It was the fourth race of the 1988 Formula One World Championship. The 67-lap race was won by Alain Prost, driving a McLaren-Honda, with teammate Ayrton Senna second and Gerhard Berger third in a Ferrari.

Report

Qualifying
Qualifying for the Mexican Grand Prix saw few surprises. The turbo powered cars were expected to dominate in the high altitude of Mexico City where the naturally aspirated cars would lose approximately 20-25% of their power in the thinner air.

The McLaren-Hondas dominated the qualifying session once again. Ayrton Senna took his 20th career pole and his 4th pole from 4 races in 1988 with a lap time that was almost a second faster than Nigel Mansell's 1987 time despite the restriction in turbo boost from 4.0 Bar to 2.5 bar for 1988 (a drop of approximately ). It was the first time in 1988 that a 1987 pole time had been beaten. Alain Prost was predictably second on the grid, though he was some 6/10ths slower than his teammate. Gerhard Berger (Ferrari) and Nelson Piquet (Lotus-Honda) made up the 2nd row. Satoru Nakajima (Lotus-Honda) and Eddie Cheever (Arrows-Megatron) made good use of the turbos' altitude advantage to qualify 6th and 7th respectively behind the 5th placed Ferrari of Michele Alboreto. For Nakajima it was something of a redemption as he had failed to qualify at Monaco. Mansell in the Williams-Judd could only make 14th due to continuing problems with the FW12's reactive suspension.

Alessandro Nannini's Benetton-Ford was the fastest 'atmo' car, some 3.3 seconds slower than Senna's pole time, while the Tyrrells of Jonathan Palmer and Julian Bailey, the turbo Osella of Nicola Larini and the Minardi of Adrián Campos failed to qualify. German Bernd Schneider qualified in 15th place for his first Grand Prix start in the Zakspeed turbo.

The last qualifying session was dominated by Philippe Alliot's terrifying crash after he lost control of his Lola, coming out of the Peraltada curve that leads onto the pit straight. After riding the outside curbing, the car suddenly pulled hard right, cut across the track and collided with the pit wall, barrel-rolling down the straight and back across the track, immediately disintegrating, and in the end stopped upside down on the edge of the track. Remarkably, Alliot was not only unhurt, but the Larrousse team was able to rebuild the Lola LC88 overnight (the re-build was necessary as the team was still awaiting a replacement chassis after Alliot had also crashed in the previous race in Monaco). After being given a clean bill of health from chief F1 medico Professor Sid Watkins, Alliot was able to take his place on the starting grid.

Race
The first start was aborted because of Alessandro Nannini, who stalled the engine of his Benetton on the grid. As is normal practice since it meant an extra formation lap and as re-fueling on the grid was not allowed, this saw the race reduced from 68 to 67 laps. On the second start, Prost made a lightning getaway and took the lead. Senna was slightly slowed by the pop-off valve opening too soon and was passed by Nelson Piquet who had actually made the best start; so good that he was almost able to out brake Prost into the first turn. This allowed Prost to take advantage and build a lead of almost two seconds by the end of the first lap. Senna passed Piquet for second, coming into the Peraltada curve on the first lap, but could only ever bridge the ever-growing gap to Prost when lapping traffic. While the McLarens held the first two places throughout the race, Berger had passed Piquet for 3rd place under braking at the end of the main straight, and by half distance he had moved to within three seconds of Senna when he backed off after receiving a 'low fuel' warning (which turned out to have been incorrect). Nakajima was also slightly slowed by the pop-off valve opening too soon on his Honda engine and was passed by Michele Alboreto on lap 8. On lap 28 Nakajima retired with piston failure in his Honda engine, followed on lap 59 by teammate Piquet with a similar engine failure.

As predicted, the turbo cars dominated the race. The two Ferraris finished 3rd and 4th (Alboreto in 4th being the last car to be lapped by the McLarens) ahead of the two Arrows of Derek Warwick and Eddie Cheever who had a race-long duel and were separated by just 0.7s at the line. The first 'atmo' cars home were the two Benettons who finished two laps down (even lapped by the two Arrows cars) and out of the points in 7th and 8th after another race long duel with Nannini coming out on top, battling not only his teammate but a pinched nerve in his right foot. Yannick Dalmas (Lola-Ford) fought his way from 22nd up to 9th at the flag and after starting 15th, Bernd Schneider had run as high as 11th in the early laps before retiring with a blown engine on lap 17.

Alain Prost set a new lap record on lap 52 of the 67-lap race with a time of 1:18.608, half a second faster than Nelson Piquet's 1987 lap record when the turbo engines had approximately 300 more horsepower. This, along with Senna's faster than 1987 pole time, showed the advancements in engines, tyres, aerodynamics and chassis development in the seven months between the 1987 and 1988 races.

Classification

Pre-qualifying

Qualifying

Race

Championship standings after the race

Drivers' Championship standings

Constructors' Championship standings

 Note: Only the top five positions are included for both sets of standings.

References

Mexican Grand Prix
Mexican Grand Prix
Grand Prix
May 1988 sports events in Mexico